Miskinli (known as Rüstəm Əliyev until 2011; also, Plankend and Rustavi) is a village and municipality in the Gadabay Rayon of Azerbaijan.  It has a population of 2,613.

References 

Populated places in Gadabay District